Guillaume Vogels (9 June 1836, in Brussels – 9 January 1896, in Ixelles) was a Belgian  Impressionist painter.

Life 
He was the son of a laborer. After his primary education, he was apprenticed to the Bellis Brothers, a house painting and decoration firm, and received a master certificate in 1855. He later owned his own decorating company in Brussels. One of his employees there was the Greek painter Périclès Pantazis, who became his lifelong friend, introducing him to the works of Gustave Courbet and Édouard Manet and showing him the techniques of painting with the palette knife.

In 1870, he went to Paris, where he came under the influence of the Barbizon school. His first exhibition was at Ghent in 1874, but his work was not well received by the critics. He didn't achieve a career breakthrough until 1880, when he participated in the Paris Salon. In 1884, he became a member of Les XX, a secessionist group. This led to a meeting with James Ensor. The two apparently travelled together on study tours to England and the Netherlands and some critics cite Vogels as a significant influence on Ensor. After Les XX was disbanded in 1893, he participated in the creation of a new group called La Libre Esthétique.

He kept no written records and left his works undated, which makes it difficult to establish a chronology showing the development of his style. Some influence from the Old Masters seems to mark his later paintings, although many display a loose brushwork that appears to anticipate Expressionist techniques.

References

Further reading 
 Michèle Blondeel, Constantin Ekonomidès: Guillaume Vogels. Exhibition catalogs, Brussels and Ostend, Pandora Verlag, Antwerp 2000, .
 Götz Czymmek: Landschaft im Licht, impressionistische Malerei in Europa und Nordamerika. Exhibition catalog, Wallraf-Richartz-Museum, Cologne 1990.
 Robert Moyens: Guillaume Vogels 150 Jaar. Exhibition catalog, Herman Teirlinck Huis, Beersel 1986.

External links 

 ArtNet: Eight pages of paintings by Vogels
 Association du Patrimoine Artistique: Espace Expo (2011), appreciation and brief biography.

1836 births
1896 deaths
Artists from Brussels
19th-century Belgian painters
19th-century Belgian male artists
Académie Royale des Beaux-Arts alumni
Belgian Impressionist painters